Yekkeh Bagh (also Romanized as Yekkeh Bāgh and Yakkeh Bāgh; also known as Yaka Bāgh and Yekā Bak) is a village in Bagh-e Keshmir Rural District, Salehabad County, Razavi Khorasan Province, Iran. At the 2006 census, its population was 163, in 39 families.

References 

Populated places in   Torbat-e Jam County